Ilhéu de São Miguel is an islet in the Gulf of Guinea and is one of the smaller islands of São Tomé and Príncipe. The islet lies 0.3 km off the southwest coast of the island of São Tomé, near the small village São Miguel, Lembá District. Due south is another islet, Ilhéu Gabado.

References

Uninhabited islands of São Tomé and Príncipe
Lembá District